A black room is a room for intercepting communications, also known as a Cabinet noir.

Blackroom or The Black Room or variation, may also refer to:

Rooms
A torture chamber
A room with no sensitive electronic signals. See RED/BLACK concept
A dark room (sexuality), a darkened room, sometimes located in a nightclub or sex club, where sexual activity takes place

Films
 The Black Room (1935 film), a film starring Boris Karloff
 The Black Room (1982 film), a 1982 horror film starring Cassandra Gava 
 The Black Room (2017 film), a 2017 horror film by Rolfe Kanefsky starring Natasha Henstridge, Lin Shaye and Dominique Swain

Music
The Black Room (KLF album), an aborted album by The KLF
The Black Room (Savant album) soundtrack composed by EDM artist Savant (aka Aleksander Vinter) 2017

Other uses
 Blackroom (video game), first-person-shooter from Night Work Games

See also

 
 
 
 
 
 
 Darkroom (disambiguation)
 Black (disambiguation)
 Room (disambiguation)